Dušan Vrťo (born 29 October 1965 in Banská Štiavnica) is a Slovakian former footballer, who played for Baník Ostrava, Dukla Banská Bystrica, Dundee and Slovakia.

External links 
 
 

1965 births
Living people
People from Banská Štiavnica
Sportspeople from the Banská Bystrica Region
Association football defenders
Slovakia international footballers
FC Baník Ostrava players
FK Dukla Banská Bystrica players
Dundee F.C. players
Scottish Football League players
Expatriate footballers in Scotland
Expatriate footballers in the Czech Republic
Slovak footballers
Slovak expatriate footballers